The geography of Guinea-Bissau is that of low coastal plains bordering the Atlantic Ocean. The country borders Senegal in the north and Guinea in the southeast.

Terrain and ecology 
	

The terrain of Guinea-Bissau is mostly low coastal plain with swamps of Guinean mangroves rising to Guinean forest-savanna mosaic in the east. A recent global remote sensing analysis suggested that there were 1,203km² of tidal flats in Guinea-Bissau, making it the 28th ranked country in terms of tidal flat area. 

The lowest point on Guinea-Bissau is at sea level at the Atlantic Ocean.

Natural resources found in Guinea-Bissau include fish, timber, phosphates, bauxite, clay, granite, limestone and unexploited deposits of petroleum. 10.67% of the land is arable and 235.6 square kilometres is irrigated.

Natural hazards include a hot, dry, dusty harmattan haze that may reduce visibility during the dry season and brush fires. Severe environmental issues include deforestation; soil erosion; overgrazing and overfishing.

Near the Senegal border there have been historic sightings of the painted hunting dog, Lycaon pictus, but that endangered canid may now be extirpated in that locale.

Climate 

Guinea-Bissau's climate is tropical. This means it is generally hot and humid. It has a monsoonal-type rainy season (June to November) with southwesterly winds and a dry season (December to May) with northeasterly harmattan winds.

Guinea-Bissau is warm all year around and there is little temperature fluctuation; it averages . The average rainfall for the capital city Bissau is  although this is almost entirely accounted for during the rainy season which falls between June and September/October. From December through April, the country receives very little rainfall.

Bissagos Islands

Information from the CIA World Factbook 

 Location
 Western Africa, bordering the North Atlantic Ocean, between Guinea and Senegal
 Geographic coordinates
 
 Map references
 Area
 Total: 36,125 km2
 Land: 28,120 km2
 Water: 8,005 km2
 Area—comparative
 Slightly less than three times the size of Connecticut
 Land boundaries
 Total 762 km
 Border countries Guinea 421 km, Senegal 341 km
 Coastline
 350 km
 Maritime claims
 Territorial sea 
 Exclusive economic zone 
 Terrain
 Mostly low coastal plain rising to savanna in east
 Elevation extremes
 Lowest point: Atlantic Ocean 0 m
 Highest point: Unnamed location in the northeast corner of the country 300 m
 Natural resources
 Fish, timber, phosphates, bauxite, unexploited deposits of petroleum
 Land use
 Arable land: 10.67%
 Permanent crops: 8.89%
 Other: 80.44% (2012 est.)
 Irrigated land
 223.6 km2 (2003)
 Total renewable water resources
 31 km3
 Freshwater withdrawal (domestic/industrial/agricultural)
 Total: 0.18 km3/yr (18%/6%/76%)
 Per capita: 135.7 m3/yr (2005)
 Natural hazards
 Hot, dry, dusty harmattan haze may reduce visibility during dry season; brush fires
 Environment—current issues
 Deforestation; soil erosion; overgrazing; overfishing
 Environment—international agreements
 Party to: Biodiversity, Climate Change, Desertification, Endangered Species, Hazardous Wastes, Law of the Sea, Ozone Layer Protection, Wetlands
 Signed, but not ratified: None of the selected agreements

Extreme points 

This is a list of the extreme points of Guinea-Bissau, the points that are farther north, south, east or west than any other location.

 Northernmost point – the northern section of the border with Senegal*
 Easternmost point – unnamed location on the border with Guinea immediately south-west of the Guinean village of Sofan, Gabú Region
 Southernmost point – unnamed headland on Ilha Cataque, Tombali Region
 Westernmost point -  Cape Roxo at the point where the border with Senegal enters the Atlantic Ocean, Cacheu Region
 *Note: Guinea-Bissau does not have a northernmost point, the border here being formed by a straight horizontal line

See also
Guinea-Bissau

Line notes

References
 C. Michael Hogan. 2009. Painted Hunting Dog: Lycaon pictus, GlobalTwitcher.com, ed. N. Stromberg
 U.S. Central Intelligence Agency.